Muakjae Station is a station on Seoul Subway Line 3 in Seodaemun-gu, Seoul. The area was named Muakjae after Muhak, a Buddhist monk who played a vital role in moving the Korean capital to Seoul in the 14th century.

Station layout

References 

Railway stations in South Korea opened in 1985
Seoul Metropolitan Subway stations
Metro stations in Seodaemun District
Seoul Subway Line 3